Nunziante Ippolito (Nunciante) was an Italian physician and anatomist. He studied in Naples and worked in one of the most important hospitals of the Reign of Two Sicilies and Europe, the Ospedale degli Incurabili. He worked also at Pellegrini hospital and at the University of Naples. Ippolito died in 1851.

Velpeau, who read an article, demonstrated that he was the first who used the ligature of the vertebral artery and indicated how to find it.

Bibliography
 Sulla legatura dell'arteria vertebrale ne' casi di aneurismi e di ferite della stessa, Annali clinici dell'Ospedale degl'Incurabili, I [1835]
 Trattato di anatomia, 1842
 Una bizzarra anomalia delle parti sessuali, 1845

References

Treccani, l'enciclopedia italiana:  http://www.treccani.it/enciclopedia/nunziante-ippolito_%28Dizionario_Biografico%29/

1796 births
1851 deaths
19th-century Italian physicians
Italian anatomists
Physicians from Naples